The Francisco López Military Academy (officially, the Marshal Francisco Solano López Military Academy; Spanish: Academia Militar Mariscal Francisco Solano López) is a service academy in Capiatá, Paraguay.

History
The school was established in 1915 and was renamed in honor of Francisco Solano López in 1948 as the Marshal Francisco Solano López Military College. During the 1954 Paraguayan coup d'etat, President Federico Chávez initially sought refuge at the college, however, was arrested by its then-director, Marcial Samaniego. In 1995 it was redesignated the Marshal Francisco Solano López Military Academy and, in 2002, women were admitted for the first time.

Organization
The Francisco López Military Academy is a tri-service school responsible for training and commissioning officers of the Paraguayan Army, Navy, and Air Force.

Admission to the academy is competitive; in 2012 there were 312 applicants for 110 spaces. Candidates are evaluated on a series of physical, medical, psychological, and academic examinations.

Notable alumni
 Alfredo Stroessner

See also
 Colegio Militar de la Nación (Argentina)
 United States Military Academy at West Point

References

External links
 Ejército Paraguayo: Academia Militar 
 Official video of ceremonies marking the academy's 100th anniversary

Military academies
1915 establishments in South America
Schools in Paraguay
Military of Paraguay